Harold Otis White (November 2, 1886 - August 29, 1969) was an American football and basketball coach. He served as the head coach at Grove City College in Grove City, Pennsylvania for two seasons, from 1917 to 1918, compiling a record of 5–3–1.  White was also the head basketball coach at Grove City for one season, in 1917–18, tallying a mark of 2–7.

References

1886 births
1969 deaths
Basketball coaches from New York (state)
Grove City Wolverines football coaches
Grove City Wolverines men's basketball coaches
Hamilton Continentals football players
High school football coaches in New York (state)
People from Niagara County, New York